Kostas Bratsos (born 26 April 1977) is a Greek professional football manager who is the current manager of Super League club Volos.

References

1977 births
Living people
Greek football managers
Volos FC managers
Footballers from Volos